Inna Metalnikova (born 13 September 1991) is a Ukrainian female track cyclist, representing Ukraine at international competitions.

Career
She competed at the 2013 UEC European Track Championships, 2015 UEC European Track Championships and 2016 UEC European Track Championships in the individual and team pursuit events. 

She represented her nation at the 2015 UCI Track Cycling World Championships.

Career results
2013
2nd Team Pursuit, UEC European U23 Track Championships (with Olena Demydova, Angela Pryimak and Hanna Solovey)

References

1991 births
Living people
Ukrainian female cyclists
Ukrainian track cyclists
Place of birth missing (living people)
21st-century Ukrainian women